The Battle of Yataytí Corá was a battle of the Paraguayan War fought between Argentina and Paraguay in Yataytí Corá, Paraguayan territory. The Argentinian troops under the leadership of President and General Bartolomé Mitre won the conflict.

References

Battles of the Paraguayan War
July 1866 events
1866 in Paraguay